Carlos Mesa (born 21 August 1955) is a Colombian former cyclist. He competed in the team pursuit event at the 1976 Summer Olympics.

References

External links
 

1955 births
Living people
Colombian male cyclists
Olympic cyclists of Colombia
Cyclists at the 1976 Summer Olympics
Place of birth missing (living people)
Colombian track cyclists
20th-century Colombian people